Tu Ai-yu (born 29 September 1954) is a Taiwanese professional golfer who played on the LPGA of Japan Tour (JLPGA) and the LPGA Tour.

Tu won 69 times on the LPGA of Japan Tour between 1974 and 2002, 11 times before becoming a member in 1981, and 58 times afterward. She was the leading money winner on the LPGA of Japan Tour seven times (1982, 1983, 1984, 1985, 1986, 1989, 1991).

One of Tu's JLPGA wins was co-sanctioned with the LPGA Tour, the 1986 Mazda Japan Classic.

Tu won the LPGA Tour's qualifying school tournament in January 1976 and played on the LPGA Tour from 1976 to 1981. Her 1986 win was as a non-member.

Professional wins

LPGA of Japan Tour (69)
1974 (1) Tokai Classic
1975 (1) Hiroshima Women's Open
1976 (2) Hiroshima Women's Open, Toyotomi Ladies 
1977 (2) Chinese Women's Open, Hiroshima Women's Open
1978 (1) Tokai Classic
1979 (3) Lake Suwa Women's Open, Sanyo Queens, JLPGA Lady Borden Cup
1980 (1) Junon Women's Open
1981 (1) Lake Suwa Women's Open
1982 (9) Mitsukoshi Ladies Open, Nasu Ogawa Ladies, World Ladies Golf Tournament, Mitsubishi Fanta Database Ladies, Hokkaido Women's Open, Lady Isuzu Cup, Miyagi TV Cup Ladies Open, JLPGA Lady Borden Cup, Sanyo Queens
1983 (9) Mizuno Golf, Dunlop Ladies Open, Japan Women's Open, Kumamoto Chuou Ladies Cup, Sanin Ladies, Hokuriku Queens, Tsumura Itsuki Classic, JLPGA Lady Borden Cup, Saikai National Park Ladies Open
1984 (7) Okinawa Makiminato Ladies, Uniden Hiroshima Women's Open, Sanin Ladies, Mitsubishi Fanta Database Ladies, Takara Shuzo Invitational, Kosaido Asahi Golf Cup, Sanyo Queens
1985 (7) Tokushima Tsukinomiya Ladies Open, Nasu Ogawa Ladies, Roku Konishi Cup World Ladies Golf Tournament, Junon Women's Open, Fujisankei Ladies Classic, Itoen Ladies, Japan LPGA Championship
1986 (9) Kibun Ladies Classic, Yamaha Cup Ladies, Nasu Ogawa Ladies, Yakult Mirumiru Ladies, Sanin Ladies, Japan Women's Open, Hokkaido Women's Open, Mazda Japan Classic (co-sanctioned with LPGA Tour), Saikai National Park Ladies Open
1987 (1) Hokkaido Women's Open
1988 (2) Marcoux Ladies, Qtai Queens 
1989 (5) Tohato Ladies, Nasu Ogawa Ladies, Toyo Suisan Ladies Open, Itoen Ladies, Kosaido Asahi Golf Cup
1990 (1) Kibun Ladies Classic
1991 (2) Toto Motors Ladies, Japan Women's Open
1992 (3) Yamaha Cup Ladies, Yonex Ladies Open, Karasuyamajo-Itsuki Classic
1993 (1) Tohato Ladies
2002 (1) Saishunkan Ladies Hinokuni Open

Tournament in bold denotes major championships in LPGA of Japan Tour.

LPGA Tour (1)

LPGA Tour playoff record (1–0)

Legends Tour (1)
2005 World Ladies Senior Open

References

External links

Taiwanese female golfers
LPGA of Japan Tour golfers
LPGA Tour golfers
Sportspeople from Taichung
1954 births
Living people